United Nations Security Council resolution 738, adopted without a vote on 29 January 1992, after examining the application of the Republic of Tajikistan for membership in the United Nations, the Council recommended to the General Assembly that Tajikistan be admitted.

See also
 Member states of the United Nations
 List of United Nations Security Council Resolutions 701 to 800 (1991–1993)

References
Text of the Resolution at undocs.org

External links
 

 0738
 0738
 0738
1992 in Tajikistan
January 1992 events